Limiting point has the following meanings in mathematics:

Limit (mathematics)
Limit point in mathematics
Limiting point (geometry), one of two points defined from two disjoint circles

See also
 Point at infinity
 Ideal point